Sima Ai or Sima Yi (司馬乂) (277 – 19/20 March 304), courtesy name Shidu (士度), formally Prince Li of Changsha (長沙厲王), was a Jin Dynasty (266–420) imperial prince who briefly served as regent for his brother Emperor Hui.  He was the fifth of the eight princes commonly associated with the War of the Eight Princes.  Of the eight princes, he alone received praises from historians, for his attempt to reform government and his courtesy to his developmentally disabled brother, Emperor Hui. According to the Book of Jin, Sima Ai was a strong and resolute man and was seven chi and five cun tall (approximately 1.84 metres).

Sima Ai was Emperor Wu's sixth son, born of the same mother as Sima Wei the Prince of Chu. He was granted the title Prince of Changsha in 22 December 289. When his father died in May 290, Sima Ai was praised by many for his display of filial piety.  When Sima Wei, at the command of Emperor Hui's wife Empress Jia Nanfeng, killed the regents Sima Liang the Prince of Ru'nan and Wei Guan, Sima Ai participated. Subsequently, when Empress Jia claimed that Sima Wei had forged the edict and executed him, Sima Ai was demoted to the lesser title of Prince of Changshan on 19 September 291.  Despite this, during the next few years, he received renown for his decisiveness, talents, and humility.  When Sima Lun the Prince of Zhao usurped the throne in 301, Sima Ai was at his principality, and he led his own troops to join the forces of his brother Sima Ying the Prince of Chengdu against Sima Lun.  Once Sima Ying and Sima Jiong the Prince of Qi were able to defeat and overthrow Sima Lun and restore Emperor Hui, Sima Ai, for his accomplishments, was restored to his original title as the Prince of Changsha.

After overthrowing Sima Lun, Sima Jiong became the regent—as Sima Ying, who was initially named co-regent with him, declined and returned to his stronghold of Yecheng.  He became arrogant and extremely controlling, and failed to pay even basic courtesies to Emperor Hui.  He also became suspicious of Sima Yong the Prince of Hejian (the grandson of Emperor Hui's great-granduncle Sima Fu, Prince Xian of Anping), because Sima Yong had initially wanted to support Sima Lun, until he saw that Sima Lun's cause was hopeless. Sima Yong knew of Sima Jiong's suspicion, and started a conspiracy; he invited Sima Ai to overthrow Sima Jiong, believing that Sima Ai would fail; his plan was then to, in conjunction with Sima Ying, start a war against Sima Jiong. Once they were victorious, he would depose Emperor Hui and make Sima Ying the emperor, and then serve as Sima Ying's prime minister. In winter 302, Sima Yong declared his rebellion, and Sima Ying soon joined, despite opposition from his strategist Lu Zhi. Hearing that Sima Ai was part of the conspiracy as well, Sima Jiong made a preemptive strike against Sima Ai, but Sima Ai was prepared and entered the palace to control Emperor Hui. After a street battle, Sima Jiong's forces collapsed, and he was executed.

Sima Ai became the effective regent, but in order to reduce opposition, he submitted all important matters to Sima Ying, still stationed at Yecheng.  As regent, he paid attention to reforming the government, and he saw the importance of formally honoring Emperor Hui while maintaining resemblance to impartial governance. He continued to try to share power with Sima Ying.  However, in fall 303, Sima Yong, dissatisfied that his plan did not come to fruition, persuaded Sima Ying to again join him against Sima Ai. While Sima Yong and Sima Ying had overwhelming force, their forces could not score a conclusive victory against Sima Ai.  Sima Ai made overtures to try to achieve peace with Sima Ying, but after negotiations, those efforts failed.  Sima Yong's forces were about to withdraw in spring 304 when Sima Yue the Prince of Donghai, the grandson of a great-granduncle of Emperor Hui, believing that Sima Ai could not win this war, arrested him and delivered him to Sima Yong's general Zhang Fang, who executed Sima Ai cruelly by burning him to death.  (Before he was executed, Sima Ai was able to write a touching letter of farewell to Emperor Hui.)  As Sima Ai cried out in pain, even Zhang's forces were mourning for his fate.

References

 Fang, Xuanling. Book of Jin (Jin Shu).

Jin dynasty (266–420) generals
Jin dynasty (266–420) imperial princes
Jin dynasty (266–420) regents
277 births
304 deaths
Executed Jin dynasty (266–420) people
People executed by the Jin dynasty (266–420)
Executed Chinese people
People executed by China by burning
Politicians from Luoyang
Executed people from Henan
4th-century executions
Generals from Henan